Revista Chilena de Literatura is an academic journal about literature published by the University of Chile. The journal appeared first in 1970 and is currently a biannual journal.

Chilean literature
Publications established in 1970
1970 establishments in Chile
Spanish-language journals
Open access journals
Biannual journals
University of Chile academic journals
Literary magazines